Kenneth R. Willard (November 13, 1902 – January 26, 1987) was an American businessman and politician from New York.

Life
He was born on November 13, 1902, in Nunda, Livingston County, New York. He attended Nunda High School, The Manlius School, Rochester Business Institute, Eastman School of Music and Columbia College. He was Secretary and Treasurer of the Nunda Casket Company. He also entered politics as a Republican. He married Helen Gillette (1909–1986), and they had three children.

Willard was Mayor of Nunda for 24 years; a member of the New York State Assembly (Livingston Co.) from 1957 to 1964, sitting in the 171st, 172nd, 173rd and 174th New York State Legislatures; a member of the New York State Senate in 1965 and 1966; and a delegate to the New York State Constitutional Convention of 1967.

He died on January 26, 1987; and was buried at the Oakwood Cemetery in Nunda.

Sources

External links

1902 births
1987 deaths
People from Nunda, New York
Republican Party members of the New York State Assembly
Republican Party New York (state) state senators
Eastman School of Music alumni
Columbia College (New York) alumni
Mayors of places in New York (state)
Manlius Pebble Hill School alumni
20th-century American politicians